Raam, also spelt Ram, is an island in Southwest Papua province of Indonesia, located off the northwestern tip of the Bird's Head Peninsula of New Guinea. Occupying the eastern half of the island is a settlement with a population of 2,078 (as of mid 2021), which forms a kelurahan within the district of Sorong Islands in the City of Sorong.

Bibliography 
 

 Penutupan Lahan 2011 (available at WebGIS Kehutanan), a land cover dataset

Sorong
Islands of Western New Guinea